Norther is an offshore wind farm in the Belgian North Sea, within the Exclusive Economic Zone of Belgium, approximately 23 kilometres from the Belgian port of Ostend. The concession was granted at the end of 2009, which is when the actual development of the project began.

The wind farm has a total of 44 Vestas V164-8.4 MW turbines on monopile foundations for a nameplate capacity of 369.6 MW with a projected annual production of 1,394 GWh, corresponding to a capacity factor of 43.1% and the average consumption of almost 400,000 households. The wind farm spans an area of 38 km2 with water depths up to 33 m. A seaweed farm is planned between the turbines.

The Norther offshore wind farm was developed through a joint venture between Elicio NV, a Belgian renewable energy producer operating internationally; and the Dutch utility company Eneco, who is a major producer and supplier of renewable electricity, natural gas and heat in the Netherlands and Belgium; and Diamond Generating Europe Ltd, is a fully owned subsidiary of Mitsubishi Corporation and cover power and water generation projects, as well as power downstream business in Europe, Middle East and Africa.

Offshore wind is expected to be a key element of Belgium's future energy mix and is projected to represent around 10% of total generated electricity by 2025. Norther Wind is operational since 2019.

See also 

 Wind power in Belgium
 Energy in Belgium
 List of offshore wind farms

References

External links 
 
 Elicio
 Eneco

Offshore wind farms in the North Sea
Wind farms in Belgium
2019 establishments in Belgium
Energy infrastructure completed in 2019